The Witches is a children's dark fantasy novel by British author Roald Dahl. The story is set partly in Norway and partly in England, and features the experiences of a young English boy and his Norwegian grandmother in a world where child-hating societies of witches secretly exist in every country. The witches are ruled by the vicious and powerful Grand High Witch, who arrives in England to organize her plan to turn all of the children there into mice.

The Witches was originally published in 1983 by Jonathan Cape in London, with illustrations by Quentin Blake who had previously collaborated with Dahl. It received mixed reviews and was criticized for misogyny. In 2012, the book was ranked number 81 among all-time best children's novels in a survey published by School Library Journal, a US monthly. In 2019, the BBC listed The Witches on its list of the 100 most influential novels. In 2012, the Grand High Witch appeared on a Royal Mail commemorative postage stamp. 

The book was adapted into an unabridged audio reading by Lynn Redgrave, a stage play and a two-part radio dramatization for the BBC, a 1990 film directed by Nicolas Roeg which starred Anjelica Huston and Rowan Atkinson, a 2008 opera by Marcus Paus and Ole Paus, and a 2020 film directed by Robert Zemeckis and starring Anne Hathaway.

Plot

The story is narrated from the perspective of an unnamed seven-year-old English boy, who goes to live with his Norwegian grandmother after his parents are killed in a tragic car accident. The boy loves all his grandmother's stories, but he is especially enthralled by the stories about real-life witches who she says are horrific female demons who seek to kill human children. She tells him a real witch looks exactly like an ordinary woman, but there are ways of telling whether she is a witch, such as real witches have claws instead of fingernails, which they hide by wearing gloves, and are bald, which they hide by wearing wigs that often make them break out in rashes.

As specified in the parents' will, the narrator and his grandmother return to England, where he was born and had attended school, and where the house he is inheriting is located. However, the grandmother warns the boy to be on his guard, since English witches are known to be among the most vicious in the world, notorious for turning children into loathsome creatures so that unsuspecting adults will kill them. The grandmother reveals that witches in different countries have different customs and that, while the witches in each country have close affiliations with one another, they are not allowed to communicate with witches from other countries. She also tells him about the mysterious Grand High Witch of All the World, the feared and diabolical leader of all of the world's witches, who visits their councils in every country, each year.

Shortly after arriving back in England, while the boy is working on the roof of his treehouse, he sees a strange woman in black staring up at him with an eerie smile and quickly registers that she is a witch. Later, while the boy is training his pet mice, William and Mary, given to him as a consolation present by his grandmother after the loss of his parents, in the hotel ballroom the "Royal Society for the Prevention of Cruelty to Children" the witches show up for their annual meeting. When one of them reaches underneath her hair to scratch at her scalp with a gloved hand, the boy realizes that this is the yearly gathering of England's witches (all of the other women are wearing gloves as well), but he is trapped in the room. A young woman goes on stage and removes her entire face, which is a mask. The narrator realizes that this is none other than the Grand High Witch herself. She expresses her displeasure at the English witches' failure to eliminate enough children. The Grand High Witch unveils her master plan: all of England's witches are to purchase sweet shops (with counterfeited money printed by her from a magical money-making machine) and give away free sweets and chocolates laced with a drop of her latest creation: "Formula 86 Delayed-Action Mouse-Maker", a magic potion which turns the consumer into a mouse at a specified time set by the potion-maker. The intent is for the children's teachers and parents to unwittingly kill the transformed children.

To demonstrate the formula's effectiveness, the Grand High Witch brings in a child named Bruno Jenkins, a rich and often greedy boy lured to the convention hall with the promise of free chocolate. She reveals that she had tricked Bruno into eating a chocolate bar laced with the formula the day before, and had set the "alarm" to go off during the meeting. The potion takes effect, transforming Bruno into a mouse before the assembled witches. Shortly after, the witches detect the narrator's presence and corner him. The Grand High Witch then pours an entire bottle of Formula 86 down his throat, and the overdose instantly turns him into a mouse. However, the transformed child retains his mentality, personality and even his voice - refusing to be lured into a mouse-trap. After tracking down Bruno, the transformed boy returns to his grandmother's hotel room and tells her what he has learned. He suggests turning the tables on the witches by slipping the potion into their evening meal. With some difficulty, he manages to get his hands on a bottle of the potion from the Grand High Witch's room.

After an attempt to return Bruno to his parents fails spectacularly (mainly due to his mother's fear of mice), the grandmother takes Bruno and the narrator to the dining hall. The narrator enters the kitchen, where he pours the potion into the green pea soup intended for the witches' dinner. On the way back from the kitchen, a cook spots the narrator and chops off part of his tail with a carving knife, before he manages to escape back to his grandmother. The witches all turn into mice within a few minutes, having had massive overdoses just like the narrator. The hotel staff and the guests all panic and unknowingly end up killing the Grand High Witch and all of England's witches.

Having returned home, the boy and his grandmother devise a plan to rid the world of witches. Impersonating the chief of police of Norway on the telephone, she discovers that the Grand High Witch was living in a castle in that country. They will travel to the Grand High Witch's Norwegian castle, and use the potion to change her successor and assistants into mice, then release cats to destroy them. Using the Grand High Witch's money-making machine and information on witches in various countries, they will try to eradicate them everywhere. The grandmother reveals that, as a mouse, the boy will probably only live for about another nine years, but the boy does not mind, as he does not want to outlive his grandmother (she reveals that she is also likely to live for only nine more years), as he would hate to have anyone else look after him.

Background 
Dahl based the novel on his own childhood experiences, with the character of the grandmother modeled after Sofie Dahl, the author’s mother. The author was “well satisfied” by his work on The Witches, a sentiment which literary biographer Robert Carrick believes may have come from the fact that the novel was a departure from Dahl’s usual “all-problem-solving finish.” Dahl did not work on the novel alone; he was aided by editor Stephen Roxburgh, who helped rework The Witches. Roxburgh’s advice was very extensive and covered areas such as improving plots, tightening up Dahl’s writing, and reinventing characters. Soon after its publication, the novel received compliments for its illustrations done by Quentin Blake

Analysis 
Due to the complexity of The Witches and its departure from a typical Dahl novel, several academics have analyzed the work. One perspective offered by Castleton University professor James Curtis suggests that the rejection of the novel by parents is caused by its focus on “child-hate” and Dahl’s reluctance to shield children from such a reality. The scholar argues that the book showcases a treatment of children that is not actually worse than historical and modern examples; however, Dahl’s determination to expose to his young readers the truth can be controversial. Despite society occasionally making progress in its treatment of children, Curtis argues that different aspects of child-hate displayed in Dahl’s work are based on real world examples. As the boy’s grandmother informs him, the witches usually strike children when they are alone; Curtis uses this information from the novel to connect to the historical problem of child abandonment. As children have been maimed or killed due to abandonment, children are harmed by witches in the novel when they have been left alone.

Reception
In 2012, The Witches was ranked number 81 among all-time children's novels in a survey published by School Library Journal, a monthly with primarily US audience. It was the third of four books by Dahl among the Top 100, more than any other writer. In November 2019, the BBC listed The Witches on its list of the 100 most influential novels.

The novel received mainly positive reviews in the United States, but with a few warnings due to the more fear inducing parts of it. Ann Waldron of the Philadelphia Inquirer wrote in her 1983 review that she would suggest not gifting the book to a child that is more emotional to particularly frightening scenarios. Other mixed receptions were the results of Dahl’s depiction of the witches being monstrous in characterization. Soon after its publication, the novel received compliments for its illustrations done by Quentin Blake.

The Witches was criticized for being misogynistic, and banned by some libraries as a result. It appears on the American Library Association list of the 100 Most Frequently Challenged Books of 1990 to 1999, at number 22. During the editing process, the editor Stephen Roxburgh told Dahl that he was concerned about misogyny in the book. However, he dismissed these concerns by explaining he was not afraid of offending women. Alex Carnevale of This Recording stated that the book is how boys learn to become men who hate women.

Jemma Crew of the Newstatesman considers it an "unlikely source of inspiration for feminists". The Times article "Not in Front of the Censors" suggests that the least interesting thing to a child about a witch is that they appear to look like a woman, and even offers the perspective that a witch might be a very feminist role model to a young school girl.

Questions have also been raised about the ending of the book, with some critics suggesting it might encourage suicide in children by telling them they can avoid growing up by dying.

English-language censorship
In February 2023, Puffin Books, a division of Penguin Books, announced that they would be re-writing portions of many of Roald Dahl's children's novels, changing the language to, in the publisher's words, "ensure that it can continue to be enjoyed by all today." The decision was met with criticism from groups and public figures including PEN America, Salman Rushdie, Brian Cox, Rishi Sunak, and Kemi Badenoch. Camilla, Queen Consort, also made remarks during a speech, which were widely interpreted as a condemnation of Puffin's announcement. In The Witches, a description of the witch's baldness and wearing of wigs was heavily altered; an additional sentence not found in the original work was added, defending the wearing of wigs by women.

Adaptations

1990 film

In 1990, The Witches was adapted into a film starring Anjelica Huston and Rowan Atkinson, directed by Nicolas Roeg, co-produced by Jim Henson, and distributed by Warner Bros. Pictures. In the film, the boy is American and named Luke Eveshim, his grandmother is named Helga Eveshim, and The Grand High Witch is named Evangeline Ernst.

The most notable difference from the book is that the boy is restored to human form at the end of the story by the Grand High Witch's assistant (a character who does not appear in the book), who had renounced her former evil. Dahl regarded the film as "utterly appalling".

Radio drama
In 2008, BBC Radio 4's Classic Serial broadcast a two-part dramatization of the novel by Lucy Catherine  directed by Claire Grove. The cast included Margaret Tyzack as the Grandmother, Toby Jones as the Narrator, Ryan Watson as the Boy, Jordan Clarke as Bruno and Amanda Lawrence as the Grand High Witch.

Opera

The book was adapted into an opera by Norwegian composer Marcus Paus and his father, Ole Paus, who wrote the libretto. It premiered in 2008.

Stage musical

A musical adaptation was in development by the National Theatre for a 2018 holiday season premier.

2020 film

Another film adaptation co-written and directed by Robert Zemeckis and starring Anne Hathaway as the Grand High Witch was released in October 2020 on HBO Max, after it was removed from its original release date due to COVID-19 pandemic. The most notable difference from the book is that this adaptation takes place in 1968 Alabama, and the protagonist is an African-American boy who is called "Hero Boy". The adaptation also stays true to the book's ending rather than the 1990 film, having the protagonist stay a mouse at the end.

Graphic novel
Penelope Bagieu wrote a graphic novel of The Witches and Scholastic published it in January 2020. the graphic novel changes different things about the original novel like, the Boy and the Grandmama are now black and they no longer live in Norway, now they live in London, and Penelope Bagieu added a female protagonist, Bruno Jenkins was excised from the story and replaced by a unnamed girl, but she’s still called Jenkins, and Mr and Mrs Jenkins are now psychiatrists both called Professor Jenkins, and instead of being terrified of their mousefied daughter they actually accept their daughter transformation and keep in contact with the Boy and Grandmama, and instead of eating, the girl actually helps the Boy, she's brave and kind, she comforts the Boy after William and Mary abandon him, she helps him get Formula 86 and she offers to poison the Witches, Penelope Bagieu made a strong female character for little girls to inspire themselves because Roald Dahl didn't created many female protagonists

References

External links
 

1983 British novels
1983 children's books
British children's novels
British fantasy novels
Children's fantasy novels
Dark fantasy novels
First-person narrative novels
BILBY Award-winning works
Costa Book Award-winning works
British novels adapted into films
Children's books adapted into films
Novels adapted into operas
Witchcraft in written fiction
Demons in written fiction
Books about mice and rats
Fiction about shapeshifting
British horror novels
Fiction about curses
Children's books by Roald Dahl
Novels by Roald Dahl
Jonathan Cape books